Chadwick William "Chad" Morgan OAM (born 11 February 1933) is an Australian country music singer and guitarist known for his vaudeville style of comic country and western and folk songs, his prominent teeth and goofy stage persona. In reference to his first recording, he is known as "The Sheik of Scrubby Creek".

Biography
Morgan was born in Wondai, Queensland, the eldest of 14 children to Dave and Ivy Morgan. From an early age he was raised by his grandparents, Bill and Eva Hopkins. After his grandfather died in 1945, he and his grandmother moved back to Scrubby Creek to live with his parents and siblings. Morgan left school at age 12 and found work cutting timber.

Morgan was discovered through Australia's Amateur Hour, a radio talent contest, where he sang his original song "The Sheik of Scrubby Creek" and was a finalist. He began recording with Regal Zonophone Records (a subsidiary of EMI) in 1952, while completing his national service obligation in the Royal Australian Air Force (RAAF).

Morgan's songs are peppered with Australian slang; one CD compilation is called Sheilas, Drongos, Dills and Geezers.

Morgan's first wife was Pam Mitchell, with whom he had three children - Allan, Chad Jr. and Janelle.

Morgan married again on 14 September 1985 to Joanie, whom he had met the year before. After their marriage Morgan gave up drinking and smoking completely.

Morgan has toured extensively, including with the Slim Dusty Show, the All Star Western Show and his own Chad Morgan Show. He has been prolific in his recorded output and live performances. In 1987 Morgan was inducted into the Australian Roll of Renown, and was awarded an OAM in 2004.

Morgan has appeared in three films, Newsfront (1978), Dimboola (1979), and the biographical documentary I'm Not Dead Yet (2011).

Morgan contributed one verse to the Gordon Parsons song "Pub With No Beer". He was dubbed the "clown prince of comedy" by Slim Dusty. He recorded a duet with John Williamson, "A Country Balladeer". He has had platinum and gold album sales and is one of Australia's most popular country music artists.

Morgan performed at Sydney Opera House with Slim Dusty in April 1978. An album of the concert was released three years later, as On & Off The Road. It was released the same year as Sheilas Drongos Dills & Other Geezers which contained 20 of Morgan's hits from the 1950s and 1960s.

In 2009, Morgan wrote a song about his Aboriginal heritage, dedicated to his grandparents who raised him as a child, titled "The Ballad of Bill and Eva". It was recorded with his granddaughter, Caitlin Morgan.

Artists who have impersonated Morgan in their shows include Col Elliott and John Williamson.

Barry Humphries used Morgan as his inspiration for Les Patterson's teeth.

Tex Morton once described Morgan as the only original country music artist in Australia.

In 2008, false rumours of his death began to surface after an announcement on radio station 4GY. The radio station later apologised for the rumour.

Award honours

Australian Roll of Renown
The Australian Roll of Renown honours Australian and New Zealander musicians who have shaped the music industry by making a significant and lasting contribution to Country Music. It was inaugurated in 1976 and the inductee is announced at the Country Music Awards of Australia in Tamworth in January.

|-
| 1987
| Chad Morgan
| Australian Roll of Renown
|

Country Music Awards of Australia
Morgan was awarded a Lifetime Achievement award at the 2010 CMAA Country Music Awards of Australia, the first person to be honoured with this award

|-
| 2010
| Chad Morgan
| Lifetime Achievement Award
| 

A bronze bust of Morgan was unveiled in Tamworth's Bicentennial Park in 2017.

Mo Awards
The Australian Entertainment Mo Awards (commonly known informally as the Mo Awards), were annual Australian entertainment industry awards. They recognise achievements in live entertainment in Australia from 1975 to 2016. Chad Morgan won one awards in that time.
 (wins only)
|-
| 2015
| Chad Morgan
| Country Male Act of the Year 
| 
|-

Queensland Music Awards
The Queensland Music Awards (previously known as Q Song Awards) are annual awards celebrating Queensland, Australia's brightest emerging artists and established legends. They commenced in 2006.
 
|-
| 2018
| himself
| Grant McLennan Lifetime Achievement Award
| 
|-

Tamworth Songwriters Awards
The Tamworth Songwriters Association (TSA) is an annual songwriting contest for original country songs, awarded in January at the Tamworth Country Music Festival. They commenced in 1986.
 (wins only)
|-
| 2013
| Chad Morgan
| Songmaker Award
| 
|-

Discography

Studio albums

Live albums

Compilation albums

Extended plays

Documentary film
A documentary film, I'm Not Dead Yet, was made about Morgan's life. It was written and directed by the filmmaker Janine Hoskings.  The DVD was released by Umbrella Entertainment on 6 June 2012.

References

External links

 
 Morgan's induction into the Roll of Honour by the Australian Country Music Foundation
 IMDB website listing for I'm Not Dead Yet
 Chad Morgan digital story and oral history - State Library of Queensland

1933 births
Australian country guitarists
Australian male guitarists
Australian country singers
Australian singer-songwriters
Living people
Musicians from Queensland
People from Wide Bay–Burnett
Recipients of the Medal of the Order of Australia
EMI Records artists
Acoustic guitarists
Australian male singer-songwriters